Wagneria costata is a species of fly in the family Tachinidae.

Distribution
British Isles, Czech Republic, Hungary, Latvia, Lithuania, Poland, Romania, Slovakia, Ukraine, Denmark, Finland, Norway, Sweden, Bulgaria, Italy, Slovenia, Spain, Belgium, France, Germany, Switzerland, Russia.

References

Dexiinae
Insects described in 1815
Taxa named by Carl Fredrik Fallén
Diptera of Europe